Adjarian's law is a sound law relating to the historical phonology of the Armenian language: in certain dialects, initial-syllable vowels are fronted after the consonants which reflect the inherited Proto-Indo-European (PIE) voiced aspirates. It was named after its discoverer, Hrachia Acharian, whose surname was also romanised in a Western Armenian form as Adjarian.

Compare:
 post-PIE *bʰan- "speech" > Classical Armenian բան ban > Karchevan dialect ben, Karabakh dialect pen
 post-PIE **dʰalara- "green" > Classical Armenian դալար dalar > Karabagh telar
as opposed to absence of vowel fronting after the non-aspirated voiced stops:
 PIE *dṓm-; Classical Armenian տուն tun "house" > Karchevan ton, Karabagh ton
 PIE *gʷṓws "cow" > Classical Armenian կով kov > Karabagh kov, kav, Karchevan kav

This conditioning is not a synchronic process, but rather reflects the quality of the original prevocalic consonant. In such cases the vowels first received the advanced tongue root ([+ATR]) feature in certain contexts and the [+ATR] back vowels were then fronted.

Dialect distribution

Adjarian's law in its full form appears mainly in dialects of the southern and eastern parts of the traditional Armenian dialect area, in modern-day southern Armenia and southwestern Turkey. An outlier is the Armenian community of Musaler on the Mediterranean coast of Turkey.

Historical development
Garrett notes that Adjarian's Law is however never triggered by voiced stops that have developed from the Classical Armenian plain voiceless stops; but it also triggered by the breathy-voiced fricative  (which developed in the involved dialects from Classical Armenian ). He proposes that the voiced stop consonants that trigger it should be assumed to similarly have been breathy voiced ,  by the time of Adjarian's law. Breathy voiced stops are recorded from several other dialects of Armenian; none of these however show Adjarian's law. Garrett interprets this to mean that Adjarian's law should be considered a type of transphonologization, where breathiness leads to [+ATR] only if it is simultaneously lost. According to Vaux, the relevant feature is instead the devoicing of the Classical Armenian voiced stops.

Adjarian's law demonstrates that the Proto-Armenian language retained the PIE aspirated stops and had not undergone a Germanic-style consonant shift. The result is important evidence against certain arguments in favor of the glottalic theory of the Proto-Indo-European stop system since such vowel fronting makes no sense if the protolanguage's voiced aspirates had been simple voiced stops. It does, however, if they were breathy-voiced. Since voiced aspirates then have to be reconstructed for Proto-Armenian, only Germanic can be claimed to be "archaic" for PIE consonantism in the glottalic theory framework.

The absolute dating of Adjarian's law remains unclear. Dates as early as the fifth century have been proposed. A likely later boundary is the formation of the community of Musaler, no later than the 11th century.

Notes

References
 
 
 

Armenian language
Sound laws